The South American Youth Olympic Games (Spanish: Juegos Suramericanos de la Juventud; Portuguese: Jogos Sul-Americanos da Juventude) is a regional multi-sport event organized by the Organización Deportiva Suramericana (ODESUR). The games are held every four years consistent with the current Olympic Games format. The first edition was held in Lima, Perú, from 20 to 29 September 2013. The age limitation of the athletes is 14 to 18.

South American Youth Olympic Games editions

Medal count 
All-time Medal count as of 2017.

Medal count 
All-time Medal count as of Medals (2013-2017)

See also
Youth Olympic Games
Youth (athletics)

References

External links 

 

 
Youth multi-sport events
Multi-sport events in South America